Events from the year 1826 in Canada.

Incumbents
Monarch: George IV

Federal government
Parliament of Lower Canada: 12th 
Parliament of Upper Canada: 9th

Governors
Governor of the Canadas: Robert Milnes
Governor of New Brunswick: George Stracey Smyth
Governor of Nova Scotia: John Coape Sherbrooke
Commodore-Governor of Newfoundland: Richard Goodwin Keats
Governor of Prince Edward Island: Charles Douglass Smith

Events
June 8 – A mob of the ruling party, the Family Compact, destroy the Colonial Advocate's press at York. William Lyon Mackenzie, publisher, prosecutes and is awarded £625 in damages.
September 21 – Construction of the Rideau Canal begins.

Births
March 10 – Louis-Ovide Brunet, priest and botanist (died 1876)
March 17 – Alexander Morris, politician, Minister and 2nd Lieutenant Governor of Manitoba (died 1889)
June 11 – James Colledge Pope, politician and 5th Premier of Prince Edward Island (died 1885)
June 21 – Frederick Hamilton-Temple-Blackwood, 1st Marquess of Dufferin and Ava, Governor General of Canada (died 1902)
June 23 – Louis Babel, priest (d. 1912)
June 29 – Robert Christie, Ontario businessman and politician (died 1914)
July 21 – Hugh Richardson, jurist (died 1913)
August 25 – Hector-Louis Langevin, lawyer, politician and a Father of Confederation (died 1906)
September 17 – Jean-Baptiste-Éric Dorion, journalist and politician (died 1866)

Deaths
November 18 – James Monk, chief justice

References 

 
Canada
Years of the 19th century in Canada
1826 in North America